The 2002 Maui Invitational Tournament was an early-season college basketball tournament that was played, for the 19th time, from November 25 to November 27, 2002. The tournament, which began in 1984, was part of the 2002–03 NCAA Division I men's basketball season.  The tournament was played at the Lahaina Civic Center in Maui, Hawaii and was won by the Indiana Hoosiers. It was the first title for both the program and for its head coach Mike Davis.

Bracket

References

Maui Invitational Tournament
Maui Invitational
Maui